Cryptoblastus is a genus of extinct blastoids, a primitive group of echinoderms related to the modern sea lilies. Fossils are found in sedimentary rocks laid down in the Early Carboniferous period some 360 to 320 million years ago.

References

Blastozoa genera
Paleozoic life of Alberta
Carboniferous echinoderms